Vidošić is a Croatian surname. Notable people with the surname include:

Dario Vidošić (born 1987), Australian soccer player
Rado Vidošić (born 1961), Croatian-born Australian soccer manager

See also
Vidović

Croatian surnames